The 2021 National League Wild Card Game was a play-in game during Major League Baseball's (MLB) 2021 postseason contested between the two wild card teams in the National League (NL): the St. Louis Cardinals and the Los Angeles Dodgers. It was played on October 6, at Dodger Stadium. The game was televised nationally by TBS and presented by Hankook Tire. Chris Taylor of the Los Angeles Dodgers hit a two out, two-run, walk-off home run in the bottom of the 9th inning to win the game for the Dodgers, sending them to the National League Division Series to face the San Francisco Giants.

Background

The St. Louis Cardinals secured a postseason berth in the Wild Card Game on September 28. The Cardinals previously appeared in the 2012 NL Wild Card Game, defeating the Atlanta Braves, and the 2020 NL Wild Card Series, where they fell to the San Diego Padres, two games to one.

With the San Francisco Giants finishing their season (107–55), they clinched the National League West division, resulting in the Los Angeles Dodgers (106–56) hosting the Cardinals in the Wild Card Game. This was the Dodgers' first wild card game appearance after winning the NL West for eight consecutive seasons. The Dodgers set an MLB record for the most wins by a wild card team.

The Cardinals won 22 of their final 25 regular-season games, which included a 17-game winning streak, the longest in franchise history. After acquiring Max Scherzer and Trea Turner at the trade deadline, the Dodgers went 44–13 the rest of the season.

This was the sixth postseason meeting between the Dodgers and Cardinals, with the Cardinals previously winning four and the Dodgers winning one. In the regular season series, the Dodgers posted a 4–3 record against the Cardinals.

The Dodgers' All-Star first baseman Max Muncy was not on the roster due to a collusion at first base with Jace Peterson on the final day of the season. It was later reported he suffered a dislocated elbow on the play and his status remained an unknown if the Dodgers advanced.

Game results

Line score

Max Scherzer started for the Dodgers and he pitched  innings, allowing only one run on three hits and three walks. Tommy Edman scored the Cardinals run in the first inning on a bloop single, stolen base and a wild pitch. Adam Wainwright pitched  innings for the Cardinals, allowing only a solo home run by Justin Turner in the fourth inning. The game remained tied until the bottom of the ninth when Chris Taylor hit a walk-off two-run home run off of Alex Reyes.

This was Mike Shildt's last game as the Cardinals' manager.  He was dismissed by the team on October 14, 2021 and replaced by Oliver Marmol.

See also
2021 American League Wild Card Game

References

Further reading

External links
Major League Baseball postseason schedule

Wild Card
National League Wild Card Game
National League Wild Card Game
Major League Baseball Wild Card Game
National League Wild Card Game
St. Louis Cardinals postseason
Los Angeles Dodgers postseason